The Whitney School is located in Green Bay, Wisconsin.

History
The building served as an elementary school for six decades. It was added to the National Register of Historic Places in 2017.

Renovation
In February 2019, the City of Green Bay unveiled plans for the renovation of Whitney School. Developers have plans to create loft-style apartments in the building, and will convert the original school gym into a fitness center for the residents.

References

School buildings on the National Register of Historic Places in Wisconsin
National Register of Historic Places in Brown County, Wisconsin
Schools in Brown County, Wisconsin
Public elementary schools in Wisconsin
Defunct schools in Wisconsin
Buildings and structures in Green Bay, Wisconsin
Neoclassical architecture in Wisconsin
Brick buildings and structures
Limestone buildings in the United States
School buildings completed in 1918
1918 establishments in Wisconsin